The New Afrika Shrine is an open air entertainment centre located in Ikeja, Lagos State. It serves as the host location of the annual Felabration music festival. Currently managed by Femi Kuti (eldest son of Fela Kuti) and Yeni Anikulapo-Kuti, it is the replacement of the old Afrika Shrine created in 1970 by Fela Kuti until it was burnt down in 1977. The New Afrika Shrine showcases photo galleries of Fela and music performances by Femi Kuti and Seun Kuti thus making it a tourist attraction.

On July 3, 2018, French President Emmanuel Macron visited the Shrine and pre-launched the Season of African Cultures 2020 in France. Macron said he had visited the Shrine as a student in 2002.

See also
Felabration

References

Buildings and structures completed in 1970
Entertainment venues in Lagos
Fela Kuti
20th-century architecture in Nigeria